Maksym Mazuryk (born April 2, 1983) is a Ukrainian pole vaulter. He was born in Donetsk. He is sporter of Fenerbahçe S.K. from Turkey.

Career
He was the 2002 World Junior champion, and finished 8th in the pole vault final at the 2006 European Athletics Championships in Gothenburg. He won a silver medal at the 2010 European Championships in Barcelona.

His personal best is 5.82 metres achieved in June 2008 in Yalta.

On 18 October 2016, he was sanctioned by IOC for testing positive to turinabol at the 2012 Olympic Games in London. However, the use of doping did not bring Mazuryk an athletic advantage, as he had failed to qualify for the final.

In May 2017, he was disqualified for two years.

Major competitions record

References

External links
 

1983 births
Ukrainian male pole vaulters
Living people
Olympic athletes of Ukraine
Athletes (track and field) at the 2008 Summer Olympics
Athletes (track and field) at the 2012 Summer Olympics
Sportspeople from Donetsk
Fenerbahçe athletes
European Athletics Championships medalists
Doping cases in athletics
Ukrainian sportspeople in doping cases
IAAF World Athletics Final winners